Atomic Hooligan is a DJ/production duo from Watford, Hertfordshire, England, composed of Matt Welch and Terry Ryan.

Their first release was "Servin' it Up", a 12" on London based label Botchit & Scarper in 2001. Since then they have released multiple singles and Mix CDs on Botchit, along with, in 2005, their first artist album You Are Here. The album  was subsequently licensed to Japanese label Village Again/Side Out. In 2006, You Are Here won 'Album of the Year' at the International Breakspoll Award. Singles from this album were "Just One More", "Head" Featuring Pav, "Seven 10 Split" featuring Justine Berry from Hey Gravity and the Aquasky remix of "Wait till your Sleppin" featuring Carpetface.

They also went on to win Best live Act at the International Breakspoll Awards in 2008 for the live tour that supported their first album. Atomic Hooligan released their second album Sex, Drugs & Blah Blah Blah in March 2008.  They have remixed Underworld (Born Slippy, Cowgirl), The Egg, Lee Coombes, Tayo, Chris Carter, Aquasky, Ils, Paranoid Jack and DJ Hal.

Atomic Hooligan also perform as a live band, and have played at the Glastonbury Festival on the main dance stage. Atomic Hooligan are also known for their eclectic DJ sets that encompass breaks, hip hop, house, drum & bass, techno & turntablism.

Discography

Releases
Serving it up EP/ Botchit Breaks/BBV003/ 2000
The Showdown w/ Jason Sparks /Botchit and Scarper  / bos2030 / 2001
In it Together / Botchit and Scarper / bos2lp 013 sampler / 2001
Club Shaker/2001 / Botchit Breaks/BBV006 2001
Music we Play / 2002 / Botchit Breaks / / 2002
Larger than Life Feat Cousin Vini / Botchit and Scarper / boslp015lp sampler / 2002
Dreams Of life/Backchat / 2S2/ 2S2 007/ 2002
The Highs and Lows / Botchit and Scarper / Botchit and scarper / bos2lp 017
Viper/ Distinctive/ Y4K005EP1 /2002
SnowBlind w/ LBJ / Botchit and Scarper / bos2cdlp 018 / 2003
B.T.P.2 / 6am Begel / Botchit & Scarper / bos2044 / 2003
Left Hand / Trigger – Botchit and Scarper / TRIG 001 / 2003
Shine a Light Feat Sweet Hustler/ Botchit and Scarper / bos2047 / 2004
Shine a Light Feat Sweet Hustler (Remix’s)/ Botchit and Scarper / bos2047r / 2004
Head / Just one More / Botchit and Scarper / bos2050 / 2004
Seven 10 Split / Botchit and Scarper / bos2052 / 2005

Remixes
Digital Pimp/Evolutionary Blueprint (A Hooligan Remix) / Collision / COLR001/ 2001
Chris Carter / Echo Babylon (Atomic Hooligan Remix) / Botchit Breaks/ BBV011 / 2002
Kraddy / Wiggidi (Atomic Hooligan Remix) / Muti / Muti004 / 2002
DJ Era / Comedown (Atomic Hooligan Remix) / Unstable / no Cat No. / 2002
Elizabeth Troy & UK Apache / Forever Young (A Hooligan Remix) / bos2036 / Botchit and scarper/2002
Aquasky vsMblaster Ft Ragga Twins/All in Check(A Hooligan Remix)/ Botchit&Scarper / bos2039/2003
Tayo & Precision Cuts / Fire Good (Atomic Hooligan Remix) / MOB /  MOB9002 / 2003
Underworld / Cowgirl (Atomic Hooligan Remix) / JBO (Internal CD) / 2003
Underworld / Born Slippy (Atomic Hooligan Remix) / JBO / JBO5024703 / 2003
Sons Of Slough / Real People (A Hooligan Remix) / Bedrock Breaks / BEDMK01CD / 2004
The Egg / The Wall (Atomic Hooligan Remix) / Square Peg / SQPG12001 / 2004
Paranoid Jack&Robb G / Disaster (Atomic Hooligan Remix) / Promo records 2005
Lee Coombs / Obsessional rhythm (Atomic Hooligan Remix) / Finger Lickin / 2005
JCat / Good times (Atomic Hooligan Remix) / Menu Music / Menu002 / 2005
Myagi / Dirty Girls (Atomic Hooligan Remix) / Money Shot /money0046 /2005
Ils / Lovin you (Atomic Hooligan Remix) / Distinctive /DISNT161
Shafunkas / Man Woman Club (Atomic Hooligan Remix) / Spin Out / ?
Hey Gavity / Inside Out (Atomic Hooligan Remix) / Riser Records / ?

Mix CDS
4 Vini / Botchit and Scarper / boslp015 / 2002
Botchit Breaks 5 / Botchit and Scarper /BOSCD017LP / 2003
DJ Mag International Allstars / DJ 363 / 2004-11-12
Atomic Hooligan & Jay Cunning / Beatz & Bobz Vol.5/ Functional /fb0092 / 2005

Albums
You are Here (CD version) / Botchit and Scarper / BOSCDLP23 / 2005
Seven 10 Split
Head
Shine a light
Who stole monkeys clothes
The Birch
Wait til you're sleeping
Spitball
Pump friction
Dreaming
Steal the sun
Twelve hundred miles
Superstar Junkie
Just one more
You are here

Sex, Drugs And Blah Blah Blah / Botchit and Scarper / 2008

Dirty
I Don't Care
Who's Ya Daddy Now?
Papercuts
Inside The Mind
Do Me In
Spread Good Vibes
Safeguard
Weed
Blah Blah Blah
String Vest
Electro Aint Electro
Thief
Too Late To Be Afraid

References

English electronic music groups